Tortriciforma is a genus of moths of the family Nolidae. The genus was erected by George Hampson in 1894.

Species
 Tortriciforma chloroplaga Hampson, 1905
 Tortriciforma perviridis Prout, 1928
 Tortriciforma tamsi Holloway, 1976
 Tortriciforma viridipuncta Hampson, 1894
 Tortriciforma viridissima Roepke, 1948

References

Chloephorinae